The Best Track and Field Athlete ESPY Award was presented from 2007 to 2012, with the exception of 2009, to the track and field athlete, irrespective of nationality or gender, adjudged to be the best in a given calendar year.  The award supersedes the Best Female Track Athlete ESPY Award and Best Male Track Athlete ESPY Award.

List of winners

See also
Best Female Track Athlete ESPY Award
Best Male Track Athlete ESPY Award
European Athlete of the Year Award
IAAF Athlete of the Year Award
IAAF Golden League

Notes

References

External links
2010 ESPY results

ESPY Awards
Sport of athletics awards
Awards established in 2007